Qufu railway station is a railway station in Qufu, Jining, Shandong. It is on the Yanzhou–Shijiusuo railway. It was built in 1981 and is under the jurisdiction of China Railway Jinan Group. The station has three platforms and five tracks, but it is used less frequently than Qufu East Railway station, which offers high speed rail.

See also 
 Qufu East railway station

References 

Railway stations in Shandong
Railway stations in Jining
Stations on the Yanzhou–Shijiusuo railway